Ruby and Oswald is a 1978 American made-for-television drama film about the assassination of United States  President John F. Kennedy. It stars Michael Lerner and Frederic Forrest.

Overview
Jack Ruby (Michael Lerner) is a warm-hearted but hot-tempered and patriotic nightclub owner, who loves President Kennedy. Lee Harvey Oswald (Frederic Forrest), a troubled loner with a speckled past is looking to merely acquire fame. On November 22, Oswald kills the president. On the 24th, Ruby kills Oswald, being motivated exclusively by his love for the president.

Cast
 Michael Lerner as Jack Ruby
 Frederic Forrest as Lee Harvey Oswald
 Lou Frizzell as Captain J. Will Fritz
 Doris Roberts as Eva
 Lanna Saunders as Marina Oswald
 Bruce French as Robert Oswald
 Sandy McPeak as Henry Wade
 Sandy Ward as Jesse Curry
 Brian Dennehy as George Paulsen
 Michael Pataki as Ike Pappas
 Richard Sanders as Agent Kelley
 Gordon Jump as Clyde Gaydosh
 Gwynne Gilford as Little Lyn
 Hillel Silverman as Himself
 Jim Leavelle as Himself

Reviews
Journalist Jeremiah O'Leary witnessed Ruby's shooting of Oswald in the basement of Dallas Police headquarters on November 24, 1963.
In a review for The Washington Times, O'Leary wrote: "The actors and the director succeeded only in making a bore of a weekend that was as exciting as it was horrible."

References

External links

1978 television films
1978 films
Films about the assassination of John F. Kennedy
Films set in the 1960s
Cultural depictions of Lee Harvey Oswald
Cultural depictions of Jack Ruby
CBS network films
Films directed by Mel Stuart
1970s American films